William Harvey "The Dapper Yapper" Warwick (November 17, 1924 – October 3, 2007) was a professional Canadian ice hockey forward. He was inducted into the Saskatchewan Sports Hall of Fame and Museum.

Playing career
Born in Regina, Saskatchewan, Warwick was one of three hockey-playing brothers which included Dick and Grant. Sister Mildred played in the All-American Girls Professional Baseball League for the Rockford Peaches. Warwick began his hockey career with the Regina Abbotts. Most of his pro hockey career was spent in the minors, but he also played 14 games with the National Hockey League New York Rangers during the 1942 and 1944 season seasons. He had three goals and three assists with the Rangers.

All three Warwick brothers played on the Penticton Vees when they won the world men's hockey championship for Canada in 1955. Warwick said of the victory, "Boy, this was better than winning the Stanley Cup." During the championship game, Warwick scored two goals as the Canadian team decisively beat the Soviet Union 5–0.  Warwick was named the tournament's top forward.

After he retired from hockey, Warwick opened a restaurant in Edmonton.

References

External links 

1924 births
2007 deaths
Canadian ice hockey forwards
Cleveland Barons (1937–1973) players
Fort Worth Rangers players
Hershey Bears players
Sportspeople from Regina, Saskatchewan
New York Rangers players
New York Rovers players
Philadelphia Rockets players
Pittsburgh Hornets players
Providence Reds players
Springfield Indians players
Ice hockey people from Saskatchewan
Canadian expatriate ice hockey players in the United States